Zhao Wei (赵薇, born 6 March 1963) is a Chinese basketball player. She competed in the women's tournament at the 1988 Summer Olympics.

References

1963 births
Living people
Chinese women's basketball players
Olympic basketball players of China
Basketball players at the 1988 Summer Olympics
Place of birth missing (living people)